Soudabeh Babagap (also transliterated as Sudabe Babagap) is an Iranian documentary filmmaker, poet, and painter. She is best known for her 25-minute documentary film Noah's Ark which won Grand Prix of the Belgrade Documentary Festival, was shown at many festivals such as Yamagata, Russian Golden Night, and Sheffield. Babagap's poems are included in some anthologies of poets from Iran and are translated in English. She is also a guest lecturer in some European universities and cultural institutes, discussing Iranian documentary cinema and prominent documentary filmmakers.

References

External links
 Cicinema: Noah's Ark
 Iranian cinema after the Islamic revolution. Part 4 : selected works
 Seven valleys of love : a bilingual anthology of women poets from middle age Persia to present day Iran
 Manifestation of feeling : a selection of paintings by Iranian female artists
 Smederevo's International Festival Poetry 2016

Iranian women artists
Iranian directors
Iranian women poets
21st-century Iranian poets